Janusz Roman Trzepizur (born 21 May 1959 in Namysłów) is a retired high jumper from Poland. He won a silver medal at the 1982 European Indoor Championships and the 1982 European Championships, both times finishing behind Dietmar Mögenburg of West Germany.

Achievements

Personal Bests:

Outdoor: 2,30 m, 30.5.1982, Eberstadt   
Indoor: 2,32 m, 6.3.1982, Milano

References

External links
 Sports Reference
 European Indoor Championships
 European Championships

1959 births
Living people
People from Namysłów
Polish male high jumpers
Athletes (track and field) at the 1980 Summer Olympics
Olympic athletes of Poland
European Athletics Championships medalists
Sportspeople from Opole Voivodeship
20th-century Polish people